The 1973 County Championship was the 74th officially organised running of the County Championship. Hampshire won the Championship title.

Points system
10 points for a win
5 points to each side for a tie
5 points to side still batting in a match in which scores finish level
Bonus points awarded in first 85 overs of first innings
Batting: 1 point for 75 runs in first 25 overs
1 point for 150 runs in first 50 overs
1 point for each 25 runs above 150
Bowling: 1 point for every 2 wickets taken
No bonus points awarded in a match starting with less than 8 hours' play remaining.
Position determined by points gained. If equal, then decided on most wins.
Each team plays 20 matches.
All counties required to achieve an overall average of at least 18.5 overs per hour. Teams failing to reach this rate fined £500, the total of all such fines being shared equally between those teams averaging 19.5 overs per hour or better.

Table

References

1973 in English cricket
County Championship seasons